The Calico M950 is a pistol manufactured by Calico Light Weapons Systems in the United States. Its main feature, along with all the other guns of the Calico system, is to feed from a proprietary helical magazine mounted on top, available in 50 or 100-rounds capacity.

The factory sights enable reasonable accuracy to about 60 meters (197 feet), but 100 meters is a reasonable range.

The .22 LR weapons use a separate design than the 9mm offerings, and share no parts with their larger siblings.

See also
Calico M960A

References

External links 
 Calico Light Weapon Systems - MODELS

9mm Parabellum semi-automatic pistols
Roller-delayed blowback firearms
Trial and research firearms of the United States
.22 LR pistols
Semi-automatic pistols of the United States